Jovice is a village and municipality in the Rožňava District in the Košice Region of middle-eastern Slovakia.

History
In historical records the village was first mentioned in 1352.

Jovice arose around the turn of the 13th to the 14th century on the territory of the nearby Krásna Hôrka Castle and was first mentioned in 1352 as  Pachapataka . The current name appears in 1427 in the form Jolees; In the same year the family "Bebek" owned 19 Porta in the village. In the 16th century Wallachians settled in Jovice as part of the Wallachian colonization. In 1773 there lived 22 subjects, 11 serfs and eight Wallachians. In 1828 there were 66 houses and 395 inhabitants who were employed as farmers.

Until 1918/1919 the place belonged to Hungary and then came to Czechoslovakia or today Slovakia. From 1938 to 1945 it was once again part of Hungary due to the First Vienna Award.

Geography
The village lies at an altitude of 280 metres and covers an area of 10.071 km².
It has a population of about 695 people.

The community is located in the Slovak Karst in the valley basin Rožňavská kotlina, below the Silica Karst plateau to the south. The plateau is separated from the village itself by the small river Čremošná, which flows into the Sajó / Slaná at Brzotín.

Neighboring communities are Krásnohorské Podhradie in the north and northeast, Krásnohorská Dlhá Lúka in the east and southeast,  Silica in the south, Brzotín in the southwest and west and Rožňava in the Northwest.

Culture
The village has a public library and a football pitch.

Population 

According to the 2011 census, Jovice had 726 inhabitants, including 546 Hungarians, 130 Slovaks and 21  Roma. 29 residents gave no information about  Ethnicity.

439 residents committed themselves to the Roman Catholic Church, 80 residents to the Reformed Church, 51 residents to the Evangelical Church A. B., five residents to the Evangelical Methodist Church and one resident each to the Jehovah's Witnesses and one to the Greek Catholic Church; one resident professed a different denomination. 93 inhabitants had no denomination and the denomination of 55 inhabitants was not determined.

Genealogical resources

The records for genealogical research are available at the state archive "Statny Archiv in Kosice, Slovakia"

 Roman Catholic church records (births/marriages/deaths): 1686-1895 (parish B)
 Lutheran church records (births/marriages/deaths): 1632-1925 (parish B)
 Reformated church records (births/marriages/deaths): 1773-1943 (parish B)

See also
 List of municipalities and towns in Slovakia

External links
https://web.archive.org/web/20071027094149/http://www.statistics.sk/mosmis/eng/run.html
http://www.jovice.host.sk
https://web.archive.org/web/20050301224845/http://www.retep.sk/jovice.htm
Surnames of living people in Jovice

Villages and municipalities in Rožňava District